Jamel Brinkley is an American writer. His debut story collection, A Lucky Man (2018), was the winner of the PEN Oakland Josephine Miles Award and the Ernest J. Gaines Award for Literary Excellence. It was also a finalist for the National Book Award, The Story Prize, the John Leonard Award, the Hurston/Wright Legacy Award, and the PEN/Robert W. Bingham Prize. He currently teaches fiction at the Iowa Writers' Workshop.

Life & writing 
Jamel Brinkley was raised in Brooklyn and the Bronx, New York City. He graduated from Columbia University and the Iowa Writers' Workshop, where he teaches. His first book, A Lucky Man, is set in New York City and explores themes of family relationships, love, loss, complex identity, and masculinity. NPR said of the collection, "[It] may include only nine stories, but in each of them, Brinkley gives us an entire world."

Brinkley is an alumnus of the Callaloo Creative Writing Workshop, and he was also a Kimbilio Fellow in Fiction. He graduated with an MFA in creative writing from the Iowa Writers' Workshop. He was the 2016-2017 Carol Houck Smith Fiction Fellow at the Wisconsin Institute for Creative Writing and a 2018-2020 Wallace Stegner Fellow in Fiction at Stanford University.

Awards 
 Winner of the PEN Oakland Josephine Miles Award (2019)
 Winner of the Ernest J. Gaines Award for Literary Excellence (2019)
 Finalist for the National Book Award (2018)
 Finalist for The Story Prize (2018)
 Finalist for the John Leonard Award (2018)

References 

Year of birth missing (living people)
Place of birth missing (living people)
Living people
21st-century American writers
PEN Oakland/Josephine Miles Literary Award winners
Writers from Brooklyn
Writers from the Bronx
Writers from California
Columbia College (New York) alumni
Iowa Writers' Workshop alumni